The Hotel Victoria is in Newquay, Cornwall, United Kingdom and is near the cliffs above the Great Western Beach. The Hotel first opened in June 1899.

History 
in the years prior to 1897 Newquay Urban District Council envisaged development opportunities of building a grand hotel. They formed The Victoria Hotel Company Limited in 1897.

The hotel was designed by the Cornish architect, John Sansom, who was part of a practice in Liskeard. He was responsible for designing a number of works in Cornwall, mostly around Liskeard, but also the Victoria in Newquay, the Porthminster Hotel in St. Ives, and various schools and churches.

Construction of the hotel, by local builder C.R Bellingham, started in 1897 and was completed by May 1899, more than a year before the Headland Hotel, by rival architect Sylvanus Trevail. The hotel officially opened on 1 June 1899.

The Hotel Victoria was built in the Gothic Revival Style, with ornate stonework, Victorian style balconies and a glass covered entrance cloister. The hotel was heated by Spencer's patent radiators.

When originally built the hotel accommodated 100 guests and their servants in suites of apartments. In later years it has been reorganised and enlarged and now caters for more than 200 guests. A feature of the Victoria was the lift that connected every floor to the bathing beaches below, claimed to be the only one in England.

References 

Hotels in Cornwall
Newquay
Hotels established in 1899